Camilla Hansén (born 1976) is a Swedish politician.  she serves as Member of the Riksdag representing the constituency of Örebro County. She became a member after Jonas Eriksson resigned. She is affiliated with the Green Party.

On April 30, 2021, she undertook godparenthood for Ales Pushkin, painter and political prisoner from Belarus.

She was also elected as Member of the Riksdag in September 2022.

References 

Living people
1976 births
Place of birth missing (living people)
21st-century Swedish politicians
21st-century Swedish women politicians
Members of the Riksdag 2018–2022
Members of the Riksdag 2022–2026
Members of the Riksdag from the Green Party
Women members of the Riksdag